Joakim Vujić (Serbian Cyrillic: Јоаким Вујић; Baja, Habsburg monarchy, 9 September 1772 – Belgrade, Principality of Serbia, 8 November 1847) was a Serbian writer, dramatist (musical stage and theatre), actor, traveler and polyglot. He was one of the most accomplished Serbian dramatists and writers of the 18th century, director of Knjaževsko-srpski teatar (The Royal Serbian Theatre) in Kragujevac 1835/36. He is known as the Father of Serbian Theatre.

Biography
Vujić was born on 9 September 1772 in Baja, a small town on the bank of the Danube which had been granted, as early as 1696, special privileges by Emperor Leopold I as a "Serbian town" (though it had always been so for a long time). His ancestors (then living in Ottoman-occupied South Serbia) arrived at this region (Rascia or Rászság of the southern Pannonian Plain) seeking refuge from the Ottoman Turks.

Vujić went to school in Baja. First, he attended a Slav-Serbian school, and then he proceeded to Latin, German and Hungarian schools. He was further educated in Novi Sad, Kalocsa and Bratislava (the Evangelical Licaeum and the Roman Catholic Academy). He became a teacher and earned his living chiefly as a teacher of foreign languages. He was an ardent supporter of Enlightenment and his model was Dositej Obradović, whom he met personally in Trieste's Serbian community before Dositej left for Karađorđe's Serbia. Joakim Vujić was a polyglot and spoke Italian, German, French, English, Hungarian, as well as Greek and Latin. He also learned some Hebrew.

His career as a dramatic author began with the exhibition of a drama in or about the year 1813 and continued for almost thirty years. Before 1813 he incurred the hostility of the Austrian authorities, especially, it is said, of the Habsburgs, by the attacks which he made upon them on the stage in Zemun, and at their instance, he was imprisoned for a while. After writing a play during his imprisonment, in which he is said to have recanted, he was freed. His many travels and literary accomplishments established his influence in the new Serbian capital—Kragujevac—once and for all and at the same time knitted him closely to Prince Miloš, who recognized in him a man after his own heart, and made him the knaževsko-srbskog teatra direktor, the director of the Royal Serbian Theatre.

He made several voyages to the Black Sea and different places in southern Russia before returning in 1842 back in Serbia, where he died on 8 November 1847.

Work and importance

He was one of the most productive Serbian writers of his time and left about fifty works. He published slightly more than half of them. Some are still in manuscript, and one was destroyed in World War II, when the National Library in Belgrade, in which his manuscripts were kept, was demolished in an air raid. He translated and adapted dramatic works (from German and Hungarian), wrote travel books, geographical textbooks, and translated novels. He compiled the first French grammar in the Serbian language (1805). He wrote in the so-called Slavo-Serbian language, a variant very close to the language of the people. Many Serbs subscribed to his publications, and he was, together with novelist Milovan Vidaković, one of the most widely read Serbian authors of his time. As such, he exercised a considerable influence on the broadening of the reading public among the Serbs. He seems to have also been among the first Serbian writers of travel books, for he began to write his first travel account as early as 1803 while touring Italy. His more important books of this kind are Travels in Serbia (1828) and Travels in Hungary, Wallachia, and Russia (1845). His famous autobiography – My Life—was also written in the form of a travel book.

Vujić lived and wrote in the time of the French Revolution (1789). He was a witness of the Napoleonic Wars, the Serbian Revolutions, the actions of the Holy Alliance, and other great events in Europe in the period between the two revolutions (1789–1848): He wrote at the time of the awakening of the nations in the Balkans and South-East Europe. In his writings and theatrical work, he propagated progressive views, liberty, human rights, ethical ideas, and international cooperation. Although he belonged by birth to a distant and alienated branch of the Serbian people, he was determined to get to know his mother country well, to return to it, and to serve it as an intellectual and patriot.

Theatre

Vujić is best known and most esteemed for his work for the theatre. It was Joakim Vujić who organized stage performances among the Serbs of the Habsburg monarchy and the Principality of Serbia. There were Serbian theatrical companies at the time in Novi Sad, Pančevo, Kikinda, Sombor, and other places in Vojvodina. The Theatre of the Princedom of Serbia was established in 1834 in Kragujevac, the capital of the newly formed Principality. It continued also when the capital was moved to Belgrade in 1841.

Vujić is the organizer of the first theatrical performance in Serbian, which took place in the Hungarian theatre "Rondella" in Budapest on 24 August 1813. From 1813, if not earlier, to 1839 he organised, with the help of secondary school pupils and adult amateurs, performances in the Serbian language in many towns of the Austrian Empire.

Joakim Vujić translated or adapted 28 dramatic works. He was chiefly interested in German drama and August von Kotzebue seems to have been his favorite playwright, for he translated eight of Kotzebue's plays. He began his "studies of theatre arts" in Bratislava during his regular studies; he continued them in Trieste in Italy, and completed them in Budapest (1810–1815). The crucial event in his theatrical career was the performance of István Balog's heroic play about Karađorđe and the liberation of Belgrade, presented in the Hungarian Theatre in Budapest in 1812.

His productions of "Black George or The Liberation of Belgrade from the Turks" in Szeged (1815) and Novi Sad (1815) set into motion the complex machinery of the Imperial military and civilian censorship, which put a stop to the further presentation of the play and other similar productions.

He produced about 25–30 plays in all, each of which represented a specific national and cultural achievement. He usually staged his translations and adaptations, and he ended his theatrical career with a production of Jovan Sterija Popović's popular comedy "Kir Janja" (Pančevo, 1839).

Legacy under Communism
Soon after World War II and the formation of socialist Yugoslavia, the Yugoslav dramatic heritage was made an object of study in the newly established Academies for Theatre Arts in Belgrade, Zagreb, and Ljubljana. The events of 1948 contributed further to this search for cultural identity. The well-known production "The Theatre of Joakim Vujić", first shown in the vanguard theatre "Atelje 212" in Belgrade on 13 November 1958 (produced by Vladimir Petrić and directed by Josip Kulundžić, the founder of the Department of Dramaturgy in the Academy for Theatre Arts in Belgrade) marked not only the return of Vujić's works to the Serbian stage but also his artistic and personal rehabilitation.

Works
 Fernando i Jarika, jedna javnaja igra u trima djejstvijima, Budim 1805. godine,
 Ljubovna zavist črez jedne cipele, jedna veselaja igra u jednom djejstviju, Budim 1807. godine,
 Nagraždenije i nakazanije, jedna seoska igra u dva djejstvija, Budim 1809. godine,
 Kreštalica, jedno javno pozorište u tri djejstvija, Budim 1914. godine,
 Serpski vožd Georgij Petrovič, inače rečeni Crni ili Otjatije Beograda od Turaka. Jedno iroičesko pozorište u četiri djejstvija, Novi Sad 1843. godine,
 Šnajderski kalfa, jedna vesela s pesmama igra u dva djejstvija, Beograd 1960. godine. Nabrežnoje pravo, dramatičeskoje pozorje, Beograd 1965. godine,
 Dobrodeljni derviš ili Zveketuša kapa, jedna volšebna igra u tri djejstvija, Kragujevac 1983. godine.
 Španjoli u Peruviji ili Rolova smert, 1812,
 Nabrežnoje pravo, 1812,
 Žertva smerti, 1812,
 Sibinjska šuma, 1820,
 Negri ili Ljubov ko sočolovjekom svojim, 1821,
 Preduvjerenije sverhu sostojanija i roždenija, 1826,
 Dobrodeljni derviš ili Zveketuša kapa, 1826,
 Sestra iz Budima ili Šnajderski kalfa, 1826,
 Paunika Jagodinka, 1832,
 La Pejruz ili Velikodušije jedne divje, 1834,
 Ljubovna zavist črez jedne cipele, 1805,
 Stari vojak, 1816,
 Kartaš, 1821,
 Devojački lov 1826,
 Obručenije ili Djetska dolžnost sverhu ljubve, 1826,
 Svake dobre vešči jesu tri, 1826,
 Siroma stihotvorac, 1826,
 Seliko i Beriza ili LJubav izmeždu Negri, 1826,
 Siroma tamburdžija, 1826,
 Serbska princeza Anđelija, 1837,
 Djevica iz Marijenburga, 1826,
 Znajemi vampir, 1812.

See also
Marko Jelisejic (1766-1832)
 Jovan Rajić
 Arkadije Pejic
 Emanuel Kozačinski

References

Further reading
 Jovan Skerlić, Istorija Nove Srpske Književnosti / History of Modern Serbian Literature (Belgrade, 1921), pp. 143–145.

External links

 Biography

1772 births
1847 deaths
18th-century Serbian people
19th-century Serbian writers
19th-century Serbian actors
Serbs of Hungary
People from Baja, Hungary
Habsburg Serbs